Tess Gerritsen (born Terry Tom; June 12, 1953) is the pseudonym of Terry Gerritsen, an American novelist and retired general physician.

Early life
Tess Gerritsen is the child of a Chinese immigrant and a Chinese-American seafood chef. While growing up in San Diego, California, Gerritsen often dreamt of writing her own Nancy Drew novels. Her first name is Terry; she decided to feminize it when she was a writer of romance novels.  Although she longed to be a writer, her family had reservations about the sustainability of a writing career, prompting Gerritsen to choose a career in medicine. In 1975, Gerritsen graduated from Stanford University with a BA in anthropology, intrigued by the ranges of human behavior. She went on to study medicine at the University of California, San Francisco. She received her medical degree in 1979 and started work as a physician in Honolulu, Hawaii.

While on maternity leave, she submitted a short story to a statewide fiction contest in the magazine Honolulu. Her story, "On Choosing the Right Crack Seed," won first prize and she received $500. The story focused on a young male reflecting on a difficult relationship with his mother. Gerritsen claimed the story allowed her to deal with her own childhood turmoil, including the repeated suicide attempts of her mother.

Writing career
Inspired by the romance novels she enjoyed reading while working as a doctor, Gerritsen's first novels were romantic thrillers. After two unpublished "practice novels", Call After Midnight was bought by publisher Harlequin Intrigue in 1986 and published a year later. Gerritsen subsequently wrote eight romantic thrillers for Harlequin Intrigue and Harper Paperbacks.

Other genres

In 1996, Gerritsen wrote Harvest, her first medical thriller. The plot was inspired by a conversation with a retired homicide detective who had recently traveled in Russia. He told her young orphans were vanishing from Moscow streets, and police believed the kidnapped children were being shipped abroad as organ donors. Harvest was Gerritsen's first hardcover novel, and it marked her debut on the New York Times bestseller list at number thirteen. Following Harvest, Gerritsen wrote three more bestselling medical thrillers: Life Support, Bloodstream, and Gravity.

In 2001, Gerritsen's first crime thriller, The Surgeon, was published and introduced homicide detective Jane Rizzoli. Although a secondary character in The Surgeon, Rizzoli has been a central focus of 13 subsequent novels (see below) pairing her with medical examiner Dr. Maura Isles. The books inspired the Rizzoli & Isles television series starring Angie Harmon and Sasha Alexander. Gerritsen also made an appearance in the series' final season as a writer who helps Isles establish herself in the literary field.

Although most of her recent books have been in the Rizzoli/Isles series, in 2007 Gerritsen wrote a stand-alone historical thriller titled The Bone Garden.  A tale of gruesome murders, the book is set primarily in 1830s Boston and includes a character based on Dr. Oliver Wendell Holmes.

Gerritsen's books have been published in 40 countries and have sold 25 million copies.

Other works
Film & Television

Adrift (1993)

Rizzoli & Isles  (2010)

Island Zero (2018)

Magnificent Beast (2022)

Gerritsen co-wrote the story and screenplay for Adrift, which aired on CBS as Movie of the Week in 1993 and starred Kate Jackson and Bruce Greenwood.

She has contributed essays in volumes published by Mystery Writers of America and International Thriller Writers. She also blogs regularly about the writing business, both on her own website and on a mystery writers site, Murderati.com.

She is also the composer of the musical piece "Incendio" for violin and piano, a waltz that features in the plot of her novel "Playing With Fire".  The composition has been recorded by violinist Susanne Hou.

Chinese legacy
Gerritsen's mother told her traditional Chinese stories eg. about Monkey King. Novel 'The Silent Girl' uses Chinese martial arts and traditional motives in contemporary Boston. One of the victims is a Chinese chef.

Works inspired by Gerritsen
Yakov's Lament (2012), a solo violin piece by French composer Damien Top, is inspired by Gerritsen's novel Harvest.

Personal life
Gerritsen is married to Jacob Gerritsen, who is also a physician. She has two sons. She enjoys gardening and playing the fiddle, and lives in Camden, Maine.

Reception
The Surgeon received a RITA award Romance Writers of America in 2002 for Best Romantic Suspense Novel.

In 2006, Vanish received the Nero Award for best mystery novel, and was nominated for both an Edgar Award by the Mystery Writers of America and a Macavity Award. She has also won approval from several of her contemporaries, including James Patterson and Stephen King, the latter of whom described her as being "even better than Michael Crichton".

Selected bibliography

Romantic thrillers
 Adventure's Mistress (1985)
 Love's Masquerade (1986)
 Call After Midnight (1987)
 Under the Knife (1990)
 Never Say Die (1992)
 Whistle Blower (1992)
 Presumed Guilty (1993)
 Girl Missing (Originally released as Peggy Sue Got Murdered) (1994)
 Keeper of the Bride (1996)
 Perfect Timing (2001)
 Murder and Mayhem (2006)
 Madame X (2008)
 Playing with Fire (2015)
 The Shape of Night (2019)
 Choose Me (with Gary Braver)(2021)

Medical thrillers
 Harvest (1996)
 Life Support (1997)
 Bloodstream (1998)
 Gravity (1999)
 The Bone Garden (2007)

Tavistock series
 In Their Footsteps (1994)
 Stolen (Originally released as Thief of Hearts) (1995)

Rizzoli & Isles series
 The Surgeon (2001) introduces police detective Jane Rizzoli
 The Apprentice (2002) introduces medical examiner Dr. Maura Isles
 The Sinner (2003)
 Body Double (2004)
 Vanish (2005)
 The Mephisto Club (2006)
 The Keepsake / Keeping the Dead (US / UK, 2008)
 Ice Cold / The Killing Place (US / UK, 2010)
8.5 Freaks (short story, 2011)
 The Silent Girl (US / UK, 2011)
9.5 John Doe (short story, 2012)
 Last To Die (UK / US August 16 / 28, 2012)
 Die Again (2014)
 I Know A Secret (15 August 2017)
 Listen to Me (5 July 2022)

References

External links

Gerritsen on Goodreads
Interview aired on NPR's All Things Considered July 12, 2010
 Literary-oriented interview by Lenn Wanner on The Crime of It All website (October 10, 2010)
 Pictures of Tess Gerritsen's office and office view, with her comments, on the Murderati website

 Interview   on the Profile website

1953 births
20th-century American novelists
21st-century American novelists
Physicians from Hawaii
American romantic fiction writers
American thriller writers
American writers of Chinese descent
Living people
Writers from San Diego
RITA Award winners
Stanford University alumni
University of California, San Francisco alumni
Nero Award winners
American women novelists
Women mystery writers
Women thriller writers
Women romantic fiction writers
20th-century American women writers
21st-century American women writers